The 1964–65 Danish 1. division season was the eighth season of ice hockey in Denmark. Five teams participated in the league, and KSF Copenhagen won the championship.

Regular season

External links
Season on eliteprospects.com

Danish
1964 in Danish sport
1965 in Danish sport